Scincella dunan  is a species of skink endemic to Yonagunijima Island in Japan.

References

Scincella
Reptiles of Japan
Endemic fauna of Japan
Reptiles described in 2022